The  is a private museum in Tsuruoka, Yamagata Prefecture.

It was founded in 1950 by the former Lord Sakai of the Shōnai Domain who donated his properties with the intention of promoting local culture. The museum houses folk materials from Shōnai, classical calligraphy, woodcraft and ceremonial sake barrels.

In addition to the Goinden, retirement residence of the Sakai Lords built in 1863, the Lord's arsenal (Mingu no Kura), and the attached Japanese garden, designated as Place of Scenic Beauty, a number of buildings have been relocated and newly built at the museum site. Two Western style from the early Meiji period built by the prefectural governor Mishima Michitsune have been designated as Important Cultural Property: the Former Nishitagawa District Office from 1881, relocated in 1972; and the Former Tsuruoka Police Station from 1884, relocated in 1957. A large minka three-story farmhouse with thatched roof known as the Former Shibuya Family Home, built in 1822 in Tamugimata, Asahi village was relocated to the museum in 1965. In 1981 a new building, the National Important Folklore Cultural Assets Storage was established.

The museum houses a number of Cultural Properties of Japan: two National Treasure tachi, a painting Wang Zhaojun (Important Cultural Property) and seven Important Tangible Folk Cultural Properties: Mogami River fishing implements, Collection of transport implements used by porters along the Himekawa river valley of Echigo Province, Collection of Kurimono and related tools from Shōnai and surrounding areas, Shōnai collection of work clothes, Shōnai collection of wooden drinking vessels, Collection of Daihō-ji pottery and Collection of Bandori from Shōnai.

See also
List of National Treasures of Japan (crafts: swords)
List of Cultural Properties of Japan - paintings (Yamagata)
List of Important Tangible Folk Cultural Properties
List of Important Tangible Folk Cultural Properties (occupation)

References 

Museums in Yamagata Prefecture
Open-air museums in Japan
Folk museums in Japan
Giyōfū architecture
Tsuruoka, Yamagata
Museums established in 1950
1950 establishments in Japan